Willy Rozier (27 June 1901 – 29 May 1983) was a French actor, film director, film producer and screenwriter who also used the pseudonym Xavier Vallier.

Filmography

Director 

 Les Monts en flammes (1931)
 Calais-Dover (1931)
 Le Petit Écart (1931)
 The Night at the Hotel (1931)
 Avec l'assurance (1932)
 Trois cent à l'heure (1934)
 Pluie d'or (1935)
 Maria de la nuit (1936)
 Veinte mil duros (1936)
  (1937)
  (1937)
 Champions de France (1938)
 (19411)
  (1942)
  (1943)
 Solita de Cordoue (1946)
  (1947)
  (1947)
 56 Rue Pigalle (1949)
    (1949)
 The Convict (1951)
 The Damned Lovers (1952)
 Manina, the Girl in the Bikini (1952)
 The Adventurer of Chad (1953)
Your Turn, Callaghan (1955)
 More Whiskey for Callaghan (1955)
  (1957)
  (1958)
  (1960)
  (1960)
  (1964)
  (1965)
  (1969)
  (1972)   
  (1976)

Actor 
 La venenosa (1928)
 About an Inquest (1931)
 Calais-Dover (1931)
 Les Monts en flammes (1931)
 Le Petit écart (1932)
  (short film, 1932)
 The Night at the Hotel (1932)
 Avec l'assurance (1932)
 Court Waltzes (1933)
 The Adventurer of Chad (1953)

Theatre 
 1933 : Cette nuit-là... by Lajos Zilahy, directed by Lucien Rozenberg, Théâtre de la Madeleine

References

External links 
 

French male actors
French film directors
French male screenwriters
20th-century French screenwriters
French film producers
1901 births
People from Talence
1983 suicides
Suicides by firearm in France
French duellists
1983 deaths
20th-century French male writers